Hajji Arab (also Romanized as Ḩājjī ‘Arab and Hāji ‘Arab) is a village in Sagezabad Rural District, in the Central District of Buin Zahra County, Qazvin Province, Iran. At the 2006 census, its population was 550, in 116 families.

References 

Populated places in Buin Zahra County